"Do You Remember Rock 'n' Roll Radio?" is a song by American punk rock band Ramones', released as the second single and opening track from the band's fifth studio album End of the Century (1980). It was released on May 16, 1980. Produced by veteran record producer Phil Spector, the song and album marked a change in the Ramones' sound, in an increased attempt to achieve commercial success.

Based on many of the 1950s rock and pop songs the band grew up listening to, the song featured more complex instrumentation and production than past songs by the band, employing the use of a piano, trumpet, horn, saxophone, and synthesizer, along with the standard guitar, drums and bass.

The album's title End of the Century came from a couplet found in the lyrics of the song: "It's the end, the end of the seventies/It's the end, the end of the century." This verse also provided the title of the 2003 documentary about the group, End of the Century: The Story of the Ramones.

The opening riff of the song appears in the 2007 DreamWorks animated film Shrek The Third, the third movie in the Shrek franchise. The song also appears in trailers for the film, as well as the film’s soundtrack.

Lyrical content
The Ramones sought to return rock and roll to its most basic roots, abandoning movements such as late 1960s psychedelic rock and early 1970s prog rock music. The song states the Ramones' philosophy in lines such as "We need change, we need it fast/Before rock's just part of the past/'Cause lately it all sounds the same to me".

Many of the band's influences are mentioned in the song, including Murray the K, John Lennon, Jerry Lee Lewis, T. Rex, The Barbarians (whose drummer, Victor "Moulty" Moulton, is mentioned by his nickname) and Alan Freed, as well as musical variety TV and radio shows such as Hullabaloo, Shindig!, Upbeat and The Ed Sullivan Show. Furthermore, a clip of Buddy Holly and the Crickets performing on The Ed Sullivan Show can be seen in the music video.

While the song celebrates the Ramones' teenage rock and roll memories, it also reflects and criticizes the trend of playing nostalgic songs on radio, rather than focusing on new music.

Reception
Record World said that "this thunderous paean to radio as it should be."

Track listing
U.S. 7" Single
"Do You Remember Rock 'n' Roll Radio?" (Ramones) - 3:50
"Let's Go" (Ramones) - 3:02

References

External links
Rock ‘N' Roll Radio at Discogs (list of releases)
The song’s lyrics at Genius

Songs about rock music
Songs about nostalgia
Songs about radio
1980 singles
Ramones songs
Song recordings produced by Phil Spector
Song recordings with Wall of Sound arrangements
Songs written by Joey Ramone
Songs written by Johnny Ramone
Songs written by Dee Dee Ramone
Kiss (band) songs
1980 songs
Sire Records singles